Pucciphippsia is a genus of Arctic plants in the grass family, reported from Greenland, Svalbard, and Magadan.

 Species
 Pucciphippsia czukczorum Tzvelev - Magadan Oblast (part of the Russian Federation)
 Pucciphippsia vacillans (Th.Fr.) Tzvelev  - Greenland (part of Denmark), Svalbard (part of Norway)

See also
 List of Poaceae genera

References

Poaceae genera